The Integrated Electronic Litigation System (iELS) or eLitigation (eLit) is an initiative by the Singapore Judiciary to replace the existing Electronic Filing System (EFS) which has been in use since 2000. EFS was conceived and developed in the mid- to late-1990s, and iELS represents the second phase in implementing technology to enhance the litigation process in Singapore.

Introduction
 Launched in January 2013 in Supreme Court of Singapore; a culmination of nearly 5 years of public sector and private sector partnership.
 Two other launches expected before the end of 2013 to bring the Subordinate Courts and Family Court into the eLitigation family.
 Paradigm shift from a document-centric electronic filing system to a case-centric electronic litigation system.
 Two sides of the same coin: Front-End case management for law firms which is a near mirror image of the Back-End case management for the Courts.
 Transparent to the public but the new Back-End in the Courts consolidated disparate systems for a more holistic case management and oversight throughout its lifecycle.
 The simplification of Courts processes coupled with use of electronic forms and enabling of online collaboration between law firms and clients through the online case file is another key evolution in the electronic litigation framework.
 Use of open standards with functionality delivered through commonly used browsers like Microsoft Internet Explorer, Mozilla Firefox, and even Google Chrome to law firms, service bureaus, and others who need to do court filings.

Case Management for Law Firms
 Use of SingPass, a national Internet authentication system for eGovernment services, for authentication instead of requiring smartcards and readers in EFS. Enables true mobility as no physical device is required (i.e. no smartcard reader).
 Every document is digitally signed and qualifies as an secure electronic record under the Electronic Transactions Act.
 Streamlined filing process consisting of 4 steps: 
a. Step One gathers all information relevant to case, parties, and document(s) required for filing;
b. Step Two presents the system-generated document(s) for the user to complete and allows the upload any other document(s) required during the filing;
c. Step Three concerns making of administrative requests like selection of hearing dates, requests for urgent handling, requests for electronic service of documents and waiver of filing fees;
d. Step Four allows the user to check that all are in order before submitting the documents to the Courts.
 User interface borrows from E-mail metaphor for organisation of tasks, notifications, and correspondences - jigsaw pieces that are part of the litigation workflow puzzle.
 A powerful document search built on top of an intelligent index that takes advantage of meta-information captured in the shift to case-centric approach.
 Online case file that presents a unified view of pertinent information. Case summary, party information, documents, hearings, billing data, and notifications are easily accessible in a tabular view.
 Access to case file is allowed as long as case is pending. Law firms can also save the whole case file as a PDF using the Pack-N-Go functionality.
 Future ability to interface with Legal Practice Management Systems to enable bulk filing of documents, e.g., bankruptcy applications, in the works.

Case Management for Courts
 Users in the Courts - Justices, Registrars, and Registry Staff, all have access to case files that are nearly mirror images of those seen by the law firms. Court internal documents like minute sheets and other sealed documents will not be accessible to the law firms.
 The streamlined 4-step process in the Front-End allows for auto-acceptance of certain documents and automatic scheduling of hearings which cuts down on manual work.
 Auto-routing of documents based on legislation or nature of case, amongst other criteria, enables the intelligent distribution of work to the various departments which increases efficiency in the processes of the Courts. 
 The use of checklists for filings e.g. probate, winding up and judicial management, allow for a finer-grained approach to document verification, acceptance, and rejection if required.
 The presence of alerts and notifications assist the users in the timely completion of various tasks throughout the lifecycle of a case.

Electronic Hearings
 Hearing fixture management is built into eLitigation. Automated publication of hearing lists to queue management and electronic signage systems within the court house and hearing lists on the web site (to be released soon).
 Electronic hearing can be done from within eLitigation and it interfaces with an electronic queue management and display system. During a hearing, the relevant documents and minute sheet are automatically opened for ease of use.
 Where relevant, customised minute sheets will auto-generate Court documents which are automatically synchronised to the law firms involved.

Litigation Process Re-engineering
 Simplification of procedures through removal of requests, changes to Rules of Court, and Practice Directions.
 Use of electronic form technology allows for pre-populated draft summonses and subsequently draft orders after a hearing.
 Law firms are able to choose hearing dates before Registrars.
 Pre-population of prescribed prayers for (a) certain applications where prayers are prescribed by statute and (b) ex-parte applications commonly dealt with by registrars.
 Standardisation of prayers for common applications.
 Use of checklists for some applications.

eDiscovery
 Ability for law firms to create Teams for assignment of Lawyers, Paralegals, and Filing Clerks. 
 Team and User Profiles can be fine tuned for case file access in order to enable collaboration within the law firm, and in some instances, with opposing law firms.
 Relevant work items, alerts, and notifications will be sent to the relevant people working on the cases. 
 Documents can be served electronically to another law firm that is an eLitigation user.
 Cause Book Searches based on new fee model.

Future-proofing
Disruption to the local legal profession is a foregone conclusion:
 There will be downward pricing pressure for routine work.
 Globalisation and entry of foreign law practices.
 Advances in automatic document assembly aided by the emergence of Natural Language Processing.

It would be wise for a technological leap to punctuate the evolution of electronic litigation in Singapore in order to assist the legal ecosystem to mitigate the disruptive forces at play.

See also
 Electronic court filing
 Electronic Filing System
 Integrated Criminal Case Filing And Management System - ICMS

References

External links
 The Electronic Filing System website
 Supreme Court website

Courts in Singapore
Legal procedure of Singapore
Legal software
Legal documents
E-government